Donegal Township is the name of some places in the U.S. state of Pennsylvania:
Donegal Township, Butler County, Pennsylvania
Donegal Township, Washington County, Pennsylvania
Donegal Township, Westmoreland County, Pennsylvania

See also 
 East Donegal Township, Lancaster County, Pennsylvania
 West Donegal Township, Lancaster County, Pennsylvania

Pennsylvania township disambiguation pages